Jaba River is a river in Bougainville, Papua New Guinea. It was polluted by waste from the Panguna mine, which specialized in copper. The aquatic life of Jaba river was destroyed due to heavy metal pollution. The environmental pollution of river was one of the causes   of armed conflict on the island and struggle of local people for independence.

External links 
 Photo of river delta

References

Rivers of Papua New Guinea
Geography of the Autonomous Region of Bougainville